"Soy de San Luis" is a song written by Santiago Jiménez, Jr. and Louis Ortega. The song came to prominence in 1990 when American supergroup Texas Tornados recorded it on their album Texas Tornados, earning a Grammy Award for Best Mexican/Mexican-American Performance.

Track listing
Digital download
"Soy de San Luis" – 3:46

References

1990 songs
Texas Tornados songs
Spanglish songs
Grammy Award for Best Mexican/Mexican-American Album